Jan Hoekstra (born 4 August 1998) is a Dutch professional footballer who plays as a goalkeeper for PEC Zwolle on loan from Groningen.

Career
Hoekstra joined the youth academy of Groningen in 2010, and signed his first professional contract with them in 2018. He signed on loan with Roda for the 2020–21 season. He made his professional debut with Roda in a 4–0 Eerste Divisie win over Jong Ajax on 30 August 2020.

On 31 January 2023, Hoekstra joined PEC Zwolle on loan.

References

External links
 
 Ons Oranje U18 Profile
 Ons Oranje U19 Profile
 Roda Profile

1998 births
People from Aa en Hunze
Footballers from Drenthe
Living people
Dutch footballers
Netherlands youth international footballers
Netherlands under-21 international footballers
Association football goalkeepers
FC Groningen players
FC Twente players
Roda JC Kerkrade players
PEC Zwolle players
Eerste Divisie players